Parnahyba Sport Club, commonly known as Parnahyba, is a Brazilian football club based in Parnaíba, Piauí state. They competed in the Copa do Brasil three times and in the Campeonato Brasileiro Série C once.

Parnahyba is currently ranked fifth among Piauí teams in CBF's national club ranking, at 215th place overall.

History
The club was founded on 1 May 1913. Parnahyba won the Campeonato Piauiense in 2004, 2005, and in 2006. They competed in the Copa do Brasil in 2004, when they were eliminated in the First Stage by Nacional, in 2006, when they were eliminated in the First Stage by ABC, and in 2007, when they were eliminated in the First Stage by Náutico. The club competed in the Campeonato Brasileiro Série C in 2005, when they were eliminated in the First Stage of the competition. The club won the Campeonato Piauiense again in 2012 and in 2013.

Achievements

 Campeonato Piauiense:
 Winners (5): 2004, 2005, 2006, 2012, 2013

Stadium
Parnahyba Sport Club play their home games at Estádio Mão Santa, nicknamed Piscinão. The stadium has a maximum capacity of 4,700 people. They also play at Estádio Dirceu Arcoverde, nicknamed Verdinho. The stadium has a maximum capacity of 8,000 people.

References

 
Football clubs in Piauí
Association football clubs established in 1913
1913 establishments in Brazil